14-18 (also known as Over There, 1914-18) is a 1963 French documentary film about World War I, directed by Jean Aurel. It was nominated for an Academy Award for Best Documentary Feature.

References

External links
 

1963 films
1963 documentary films
1960s French-language films
French documentary films
French war films
Black-and-white documentary films
Films directed by Jean Aurel
Documentary films about World War I
1960s French films